Clube Atlético Juventus, usually known as Juventus de Seara or simply Juventus, is a Brazilian football club from Seara, Santa Catarina.

History
Initially focused only in the youth categories, Juventus started a senior team in late 2013, ahead of the following year's Campeonato Catarninense Série C. The club lifted the trophy unbeaten, with the goalscorer being Rodrigo Gral.

Promoted to the Série B, Juventus finished the tournament in the fourth position, and had Juninho Brandão as the championship's top goalscorer. On 16 November 2015, the club announced his withdrawal from the following year's tournament due to financial problems, and returned to only work with the youth categories.

References

External links
 
Ogol team profile 

Association football clubs established in 1962
1962 establishments in Brazil
Football clubs in Santa Catarina (state)